Bay de Noc Community College (Bay College) is a public community college in Escanaba, Michigan. Founded in 1962, the college has a main campus in Escanaba and another  campus, Bay College West, in Iron Mountain, Michigan, serving Dickinson County.

Academics
The college offers several certificate programs, as well as programs for two-year Associate Degrees; Associate in Arts (AA), Associate in Science (AS), Associate in Applied Science (AAS).  Bay College is also home of the first Michigan Technical Education Center (M-Tec), which offers training and development courses. Together, the college and M-Tec host over 40,000 visits each year. In 2016, Bay College was awarded a grant from Achieving the Dream (ATD), which uses Open Educational Resources (OER).

Athletics
As of 2017, Bay College Norse Athletics offers Men's and Women's basketball and Men's and Women's cross country, and competes in the MCCAA.

Notable alumni
 Chad Hord, professional off-road racing driver
 Josh Parisian, UFC mixed martial artist
 Travis Wiltzius, head football coach at Finlandia

Images

References

External links
 Official website
 Official athletics website

Two-year colleges in the United States
Education in Delta County, Michigan
Community colleges in Michigan
Educational institutions established in 1962
Buildings and structures in Delta County, Michigan
1962 establishments in Michigan